Philip Pocock Catholic Secondary School (alternatively called as Philip Pocock, PPCSS, PP, Philip Pocock CSS, or Pocock) is a Roman Catholic high school in Mississauga, Ontario, Canada. It is operated by the Dufferin-Peel Catholic District School Board and has approximately 1,350 students. The school includes an Extended French Program as well as an Advanced Placement Program for Mathematics and the Sciences (Biology, Physics, Chemistry). The school building is similar to that of St. Joseph Secondary School in Mississauga, which was modelled after Philip Pocock.

The school's athletes are called the "Pocock Pirates."

History
The first Philip Pocock location opened in 1981 by the Dufferin-Peel Separate School Board and was at the site where John Cabot Catholic Secondary School is currently located. Then, due to an increasing student population, Philip Pocock's grade 11-13 students were temporarily located at Vincent Massey Collegiate Institute in Etobicoke, Ontario, from 1987 to 1992 until construction of the new, permanent third location was completed at the intersection of Tomken Road and Eglinton Avenue in Mississauga. This third and current location at Tomken and Eglinton opened in 1992. Presently, Massey became the Metropolitan Separate School Board (now the Toronto Catholic District School Board)'s Michael Power/St. Joseph High School campus in 1993.

Origins
Philip Francis Pocock was born in St. Thomas, Ontario, on July 2, 1906. He studied Theology at St. Peter's Seminary, London, and was ordained on June 14, 1930, by Bp. Denis P. O'Connor of Peterborough at St. Peter's Cathedral, London. In 1933, Father Pocock went to Rome for graduate studies and obtained the degree of Doctor of Canon Law. On April 7, 1944, he was appointed Bishop of Saskatoon. On June 16, 1951, Bp. Pocock was named Apostolic Administrator of Winnipeg, and on August 6 of the same year, Coadjutor Archbishop of Winnipeg. Abp. Pocock succeeded to the See as Archbishop on January 14, 1952. Due to Card. McGuigan's poor health, Abp. Pocock was appointed Coadjutor Archbishop of Toronto on February 18, 1961. He succeeded to the See of Toronto and became Archbishop upon Cardinal McGuigan's resignation on March 30, 1971. On April 29, 1978, Archbishop Pocock resigned the See of Toronto and took up residence at St. Mary's Parish, Brampton. He remained active as a priest, celebrating mass at elementary schools, confirming students, and visiting a senior citizens' home as well as performing his parish duties. He died on September 6, 1984, and was interred in Holy Cross Cemetery, Thornhill.

Athletics
The Philip Pocock Pirates compete locally in the Region of Peel Athletics Association (ROPSSAA) and provincially with OFSAA. Philip Pocock Athletics has a storied past with many ROPSSAA, DPAA, and TDCAA championships. Some of the notable championship teams include boys football, which have achieved 3 championships at both the junior and senior levels; Track and Field, which achieved overall ROPSSAA championships in 1999–2002; and girls rugby, which won ROPSSAA gold in 2008.

Feeder Schools
 St. Alfred Catholic Elementary School
 St. Basil Catholic Elementary School
 St. Sofia Catholic Elementary School (Ukrainian Catholic)
 St. Thomas More Catholic Elementary School
 St. Jude Separate School
 Sts. Martha and Mary Catholic Elementary School

Extended French Program 
The Extended French Program in the province of Ontario typically begins in grade five and continues until the end of high school. Philip Pocock encourages its Extended French students to participate in French language and French public speaking contests, sponsored by Canadian Parents for French.

French Immersion Program 
As of September 2019, Dufferin-Peel Catholic District School Board added French Immersion Program due to a substantial demand for the program. In subsequent years, it will be added to Grade 12.

Notable alumni
 Zac Rinaldo, hockey player with the Boston Bruins
 Cody Bass, hockey player with the Nashville Predators organization
 Luca Caputi, former hockey player with the Anaheim Ducks organization
 Jason Spezza, hockey player with the Toronto Maple Leafs
 Anthony Carelli, WWE professional wrestler under the ring name Santino Marella
 John Tavares, the National Lacrosse League's all-time career goals, assists, and points leader; all with the Buffalo Bandits
 Natalia Kusendova, Ontario PC Member of Provincial Parliament for Mississauga Centre

See also
List of high schools in Ontario

References

High schools in Mississauga
Catholic secondary schools in Ontario
Educational institutions established in 1981
1981 establishments in Ontario
Relocated schools